De Chambrun is a surname. Notable people with the surname include:

Charles de Chambrun (1875–1952) (1875–1952), French diplomat and writer
Clara Longworth de Chambrun (1873–1954), American patron of the arts and scholar of Shakespeare
Comtesse Jean-François de Chambrun or Raine Spencer, Countess Spencer (born 1929), British socialite and local politician
Pierre de Chambrun (1865–1954), French politician
Pineton de Chambrun, French aristocratic family, of which several members have taken an important part in French politics
René de Chambrun (1906–2002), lawyer at the Court of Appeals of Paris and of the New York State Bar Association

See also
Josée and René de Chambrun Foundation, a non-profit charitable foundation based in Paris, France